The 1994 European Wrestling Championships were held in the Greco-Romane in Athens 15 – 18 April 1994; the men's Freestyle style in Rome 8 – 11 April 1994.

Medal table

Medal summary

Men's freestyle

Men's Greco-Roman

References

External links
Fila's official championship website

Europe
W
W
European Wrestling Championships
Euro
Euro
Sports competitions in Rome
Sports competitions in Athens
1994 in European sport